In the field of chemical biology, a chemical probe is a small molecule that is used to study and manipulate a biological system such as a cell or an organism by reversibly binding to and altering the function of a biological target (most commonly a protein) within that system. Probes ideally have a high affinity and binding selectivity for one protein target as well as high efficacy.  By changing the phenotype of the cell, a molecular probe can be used to determine the function of the protein with which it interacts.

See also 
 Chemical Probes Portal

References 

Chemical biology